Transport in Halifax, Nova Scotia consists of a variety of modes.

Air
Halifax Stanfield International Airport, which serves HRM and virtually all of peninsular Nova Scotia, is located in the northern part of the municipality near the border with Hants County in Enfield.

The Shearwater Heliport is a Royal Canadian Air Force heliport that is part of a collection of properties comprising CFB Halifax. Shearwater is located on the eastern side of Halifax Harbour and used to serve fixed wing aircraft as well as helicopters prior to its conversion to a heliport in the early 2000s.

There are also five separate heliports located in the HRM urban core, several for hospitals. Several privately run aerodromes are also located in rural areas.

Water
The Halifax Port Authority manages many of the commercial port operations on Halifax Harbour, including bulk cargo, general cargo and intermodal container terminals. The Royal Canadian Navy and the Canadian Coast Guard also have extensive waterfront facilities.

The second largest port facility in HRM is located at Sheet Harbour. Also managed by the Halifax Port Authority (since 2011), the port of Sheet Harbour operates as a local port and is primarily used to ship forest products from the Musquodoboit Valley as well as the industrial Pictou County area during the winter months (when Pictou Harbour is ice-bound).

Rail
HRM is the eastern terminus of the Canadian National Railway (CN), which provides direct freight service to Montreal, Toronto, and Chicago for cargo arriving at either of the Port of Halifax's two container terminals, or the port's general cargo and specialized cargo piers. CN operates rail lines around both the west and east sides of the harbour, serving Halifax and Dartmouth respectively.

The Windsor and Hantsport Railway is a short line railway which operated a former Canadian Pacific Railway line in HRM from its interchange point with CN at Windsor Junction through to the agricultural heartland of Nova Scotia at New Minas in the Annapolis Valley. This rail line ceased operation in 2010, however the track and right of way remain intact for a possible future resumption of service.

Via Rail Canada also operates from the Halifax Railway Station where the Ocean, a passenger train equipped with sleeper cars operates three days a week to Truro, Moncton, and Montreal.  The Halifax Railway Station also serves as the terminus for intercity buses (operated by Maritime Bus) which connect with destinations across the Maritimes.

Two important branch rail lines operated by CN were abandoned in the Halifax Regional Municipality in recent decades.  One line ran along the Eastern Shore from Dartmouth to Musquodoboit Harbour and up the Musquodoboit Valley, serving the agriculture and forestry and pelletized lime industries. The other line ran along the South Shore from Halifax to Bridgewater and on to Yarmouth. The rail corridors of both routes are still intact and used as recreational pathways, preserved by the provincial and municipal governments for possible reinstatement of rail service.

Surface infrastructure
Roads and bridges
The urban core is divided by Halifax Harbour and is linked by two suspension bridges: the Angus L. Macdonald Bridge, since 1955, and the A. Murray MacKay Bridge, since 1970.

Traffic is problematic in older parts of the urban core area due to geographic constrictions and an aging road network designed for less vehicle capacity than is currently being handled. The Halifax Peninsula, similar to an island, has several bottleneck points through which any traffic leaving the area must pass:
 the Angus L. Macdonald Bridge
 the A. Murray MacKay Bridge
 the Armdale traffic circle
 the Bayers Road and Connaught Avenue interchange to the Highway 102 freeway
 the Windsor Street exchange in Fairview with the Bedford Highway (Trunk 2)

Traffic and congestion
Vehicle traffic density is increasing somewhat on the peninsula, however, the population of workers living in suburban areas or commuting from more distant exurban/outskirts has increased at a much higher rate in recent decades. Roads in existing developed suburban areas and the historic districts on the Halifax Peninsula cannot be easily expanded.

Several controversial road widening projects are being debated, including one for Bayers Road, and for Robie Street, the major north-south artery on the peninsula. It was controversial because the municipal government expropriated land from residential landowners.

 Provincial roads and expressways
Some newer neighbourhoods in the municipality include a network of expressways (Nova Scotia 100-series highways) developed during the 1960s-1980s (Highways 101, 102, 103, 107, 111, and 118); however these roads serve mainly to dump high-speed traffic onto the low-speed urban street network.

Many of the roads in the rural areas of the municipality are two lane provincial collector and trunk highways, the longest being Trunk 7 which runs from Bedford east to the boundary with Guysborough County at Ecum Secum.

 Proposed infrastructure
In 1963, an urban expressway to be called Harbour Drive was proposed to run along the eastern side of the Peninsula. it met with fierce opposition, but not before construction of the Cogswell Interchange, what would turn out to be an overbuilt series of roads, ramps and roadway immediately north of the downtown, effectively curtailing its natural development. By 2014, the infrastructure had aged sufficiently to warrant its removal and in 2016 the municipal government voted to hire a company to develop a plan for its removal and replacement by a more appropriate road network.  

A proposed bridge across the Northwest Arm to relieve traffic congestion on the Armdale Rotary (it would connect at South Street near Dalhousie University) was rejected several times by residents of the peninsula's affluent South End and by environmentalists advocating improved rapid transit and better planning to densify residential development close to locations of employment.

In 2008 the Halifax Dartmouth Bridge Commission released a report on a possible third harbour crossing which considered both a six-lane bridge, costing $1.1 Billion, and a four-lane tunnel, costing $1.4 Billion, extending from the southern terminus of Highway 111 to the southern end of the peninsula near the Halifax Ocean Terminals.

Because of the insular nature of the central business area, the concept of congestion tolling has been floated in the city from time to time. In 2011, a scholarly report studied the feasibility of implementing such a scheme.

Transit

Urban core
The HRM urban core is served by Halifax Transit which was formed on March 1, 1981 through the merger of the municipally owned Halifax Transit Corporation and its counterpart the Dartmouth Transit Corporation. The main forms of public transportation are standard transit buses and a new bus-rapid transit system, as well as the Halifax–Dartmouth Ferry Service in Halifax Harbour.

The ferry system uses three vessels, with a fourth under construction, and connects peninsular Halifax with Dartmouth, offering daily services. It is the oldest continuously operating saltwater ferry service in North America. Controversial high-speed ferries are under consideration for connecting downtown Halifax with Shannon Park, Bedford, the South Mainland, and Eastern Passage.

The proposed high speed ferry services are viewed with concern by other harbour users and are viewed as a compromise solution for connecting travellers from points along the harbour with downtown Halifax and Dartmouth. Transit surveys have indicated that many existing and potential future users of public transit require service to areas such as universities, hospitals and shopping centres, many of which are located near or adjacent to railway corridors in the region. Former mayor, Peter Kelly, and several regional councillors have favoured instituting a commuter rail or a light rail system on current and abandoned railway lines and several streets in the urban core, however such a proposal would require provincial and federal funding and agreement with railway companies. It has been shelved by HRM staff and politicians, pending the provincial government's creation of a regional transportation planning authority, similar to what eastern Massachusetts did in the 1960s when MBTA was created.

Historically, the Halifax Peninsula had an extensive streetcar transit system dating to the late 1800s.  Operated by various private companies including the "Halifax Street Railway Co.", the "Nova Scotia Power Co." (not the same company as the present electric utility), the "Halifax Electric Tramway Co.", the "Nova Scotia Tramways and Power Co.", and the " Nova Scotia Light and Power Company, Limited", the streetcar system was abandoned by NSL&P on March 26, 1949.  Streetcars were replaced by an electric trolley coach system, however, the last electric trolley coaches were replaced by conventional diesel buses on January 1, 1970 operated by the Halifax Transit Corporation.

Rural areas
A community transit bus service is also run by Halifax Transit, serving the exurban communities of Beaver Bank, Fall River, East Preston, Lake Echo, Porters Lake and Grand Desert. However, there is little to no public transit available for residents in more rural areas especially for the Eastern Shore, South Shore and Musquodoboit Valley area of the municipality; this has become a growing bone of contention driving the urban-rural tension within the region.

The rural area are dependent upon privately operated bus and shuttle services, as well as individual car pooling.  The municipality plans to extend its community bus program along the Eastern Shore and Musquodoboit Valley which will see buses operate from Dartmouth to Sheet Harbour to Upper Musquodoboit to Enfield and return to Dartmouth, however there is no timeline for its implementation and the proposal is currently being studied and surveyed .

Halifax Regional Municipality is currently studying the possibility of implementing a series of expanded bus rapid transit services along expressways such as Highways 102, 103 and 107. A Rural Express Bus (MetroX) began servicing Upper Tantallon, Nova Scotia in August 2009.

Walking and cycling 

There are many parks and some disconnected trails in the HRM urban core. There are proposals for a Halifax Urban Greenway, which is envisioned to ultimately connect or construct trails around the entire perimeter of Halifax Harbour and the Bedford Basin to link downtown Halifax and Dartmouth, however implementation is moving slowly. The most notable achievement to date was the completion in 2011 of the Beaufort Avenue Multi-use Trail in South End Halifax. Most streets in the urban core have sidewalks and pedestrian crossings for major roads are signalized. 

Halifax Regional Council has a stated interest in improving bicycle transport in the urban core. After the 2000 municipal election a part-time coordinating position was created to oversee the planning and implementation of a bicycle transport plan which was published in 2002 as the Blueprint for a Bicycle-Friendly HRM. The coordinating position was eliminated during budget cuts in 2003 but a new permanent position was later created, that of Active Transportation coordinator. A cycling map was published in 2005 and updated in 2009 and 2012. Meanwhile, an Active Transportation master plan was completed in 2006 and a plan review was initiated in 2013. The 3-kilometre Dartmouth Harbourfront Walkway was built in 2003 and the 6-kilometre Bedford-Sackville Connector was completed in 2006 at a cost of nearly a million dollars. on its completion, it allowed pedestrians and cyclists to safely move between suburban Sackville and Bedford for the first time since the completion of Highway 102 in the 1960s. In 2009, the city obtained the Chester Spur of the Canadian National Railways, an abandoned rail line, at a cost of $2,700,000. In 2011 the tracks were removed and the paved Chain of Lakes Multipurpose Trail was built in the rail corridor. Plans were advancing in 2012 for an peninsular bike route. 

Overall, HRM remains fairly difficult for bicycles, partially as a result of geography and climate, but also traffic congestion and significant gaps in the cycling network. Despite these weaknesses, there has been a gradual increase in the number of bicycle lanes and designated bike routes in the urban core. By 2013, HRM had  of AT facilities (131 kilometres of greenway and 96 kilometres of bike lanes). The first protected cycling lane in Halifax opened in November 2015 as a pilot project. The lanes are separated from automotive traffic by a painted median and plastic bollards.

See also

References

External links

 Transportation planning – Halifax Regional Municipality website